Aleksa Popović (born 31 July 1987) is a Montenegrin professional basketball player for KK Bosna Royal of the Basketball Championship of Bosnia and Herzegovina.

Popović spent the 2020–21 season with Lovćen 1947 of the Montenegrin Basketball League. He averaged 8.7 points, 1.8 rebounds, and 1.3 assists per game. On September 7, 2021, Popović signed with KK Bosna Royal of the Bosnian league.

References

External links 
 Profile at aba-liga.com
 Profile at eurobasket.com

Living people
1987 births
ABA League players
Basketball League of Serbia players
KK Budućnost players
KK Studentski centar players
KK Lovćen players
KK Metalac Valjevo players
KK Sutjeska players
Montenegrin expatriate basketball people in Serbia
Montenegrin men's basketball players
Szolnoki Olaj KK players
2019 FIBA Basketball World Cup players
Small forwards
Shooting guards